Dechen is a Tibetan name meaning "great bliss". It is a Tibetan translation of the Sanskrit term . It is commonly used in Nepal, Tibet, and Bhutan. People with the name Dechen include:

Pabongkhapa Déchen Nyingpo (1878–1941), lama of the Gelug school
Pema Dechen (1918–1991), third queen consort of Bhutan
Dechen Wangmo (Tibetan Buddhist), daughter of a Tibetan noble family
Dechen Shak-Dagsay (born 1959), singer of traditional Tibetan Buddhist mantras
Dechen Wangmo (politician) (born ), Bhutanese politician who was made Minister for Health in November 2018
Dechen Roder (born 1980), Bhutanese filmmaker
Dechen Yangzom Wangchuck (born 1981), daughter of the fourth king of Bhutan
Sonam Dechen Wangchuck (born 1981), daughter of the fourth king of Bhutan
Dechen Pem, Bhutanese singer
Dechen Zangmo, member of the National Assembly of Bhutan

References

Tibetan names